Panther Creek is a stream in eastern Bollinger and western Cape Girardeau counties in the U.S. state of Missouri. It is a tributary of Whitewater River which it enters approximately two miles south of Millersville. 

Panther Creek was named for fact the area once was the hunting ground of panthers.

See also
List of rivers of Missouri

References

Rivers of Bollinger County, Missouri
Rivers of Cape Girardeau County, Missouri
Rivers of Missouri